The Apostle (Spanish: El apostolado) is a 2020 Guatemalan drama film written, directed and produced by Juan Manuel Méndez in his directorial debut. The film was shortlisted by the Guatemalan Association of Audiovisual and Cinematography along with La Llorona and Luz to represent Guatemala in the category of Best International Feature Film at the 93rd Academy Award, but was not chosen. But it was chosen to represent Guatemala in the category of Best Ibero-American Film at the 36th Goya Awards, however, it was not nominated.

Synopsis 
In a city where corruption, abuse and violence are our daily bread, a priest spends his days listening to people who search for the relief of telling their problems in exchange for a hot meal. Everything will change when he'll meet two women that will make his search to take another turn.

Cast 

 Sebastián de la Hoz as The priest
 Andrea Gálvez as Inés
 Devayani Morales as Esmeralda
 Luis Barrillas as Eliseo
 Humberto Rodríguez as Chente
 Rodrigo Maegli as Jefferson
 Lucía Montepeque as Julieta
 Juan Pensamiento as The Shepherd
 Mynor Sacarías as "El Seco"

Idealization 
Mendel at the beginning had great ambitions for the project, trying to carry it out in France, however, it was a very difficult challenge due to financing issues, so Méndez thought it would be more viable to make a smaller film, quoting his words: "I needed to record something that was achievable and above all affordable. I had the idea of ​​this character who liked to help people and among everything that made me more logical I had the image of this priest".

Release 
El apostolado had planned a commercial release in theaters in Guatemala in 2020, but it was canceled due to the COVID-19 pandemic. Later, it was announced that the film will have a digital release on Vimeo on Demand between September 18, 2020, and 25 of the same month.

References

External links 

 

2020 films
2020 drama films
Guatemalan drama films
2020s Spanish-language films
Films set in Guatemala
Films shot in Guatemala
Films about social class
2020 directorial debut films
Films impacted by the COVID-19 pandemic
Films not released in theaters due to the COVID-19 pandemic